The 2022 Houston Christian Huskies football team represented Houston Christian University as a member of the Southland Conference during the 2022 NCAA Division I FCS football season. Led by tenth-year head coach Vic Shealy, the Huskies played home games at Husky Stadium in Houston.

Preseason

Preseason poll
The Southland Conference released their preseason poll on July 20, 2022. The Huskies were picked to finish last in the conference.

Preseason All–Southland Teams

Schedule
Houston Christian finalized their 2022 schedule on February 16, 2022.

Game summaries

at Northern Colorado

Lindenwood

at Texas State

at Lamar

Statistics

Nicholls

Northwestern State

at Texas A&M-Commerce

No. 21 UT Martin

at No. 7 Incarnate Word

McNeese State

at Tarleton State

References

Houston Christian
Houston Christian Huskies football seasons
Houston Christian Huskies football